Margaret Moore White FRCS FRCOG (5 February 1902 - 17 January 1983) was an English gynaecologist who, with Miss Gertrude Dearnley, began one of the first infertility clinics in Britain at the Royal Free Hospital in 1937.

Selected publications
 The Symptomatic Diagnosis and Treatment of Gynaecological Disorders. H. K. Lewis & Co., 1944.
 Womanhood. Cassell, London, 1947.
 "Uteroplasty in Infertility", Proceedings of the Royal Society of Medicine, Vol. 53, Issue 12, pp. 1006–1009.
 The Management of Impaired Fertility. Oxford University Press, London, 1962. (With Vivian Bartley Green-Armytage)

References 

1902 births
1983 deaths
Fellows of the Royal College of Surgeons
Women gynaecologists
Physicians of the Royal Free Hospital